I'll Name the Murderer is a 1936 American crime film produced by C.C. Burr for Puritan Pictures, directed by Raymond K. Johnson and starring Ralph Forbes, Marion Shilling and Malcolm McGregor. The story and screenplay was written by Phil Dunham with special dialogue by Edwin K. O'Brien, and the film was released January 27, 1936. This was Schilling's last film.

Plot

It is the opening night of Luigi’s (Harry Semels) nightclub, gossip columnist Tommy Tilton (Ralph Forbes) is at the nightclub with his photographer, Smitty (Marion Schilling). Tilton runs into his college friend Ted Benson (Malcom McGregor) who is engaged to Vi Van Ostrum (Charlotte Barr-Smith).

Behind the scenes one of the dancers, Valerie Delroy, and the nightclub’s featured singer, Nadia Renee, have an argument which results in Luigi firing Valerie and her dance partner Walton (Gayne Kinsey).

Benson is being blackmailed by Nadia for love letters that he had written her before his engagement to Vi. Tilton agrees to talk Nadia into relinquishing the letters, which she agrees to, but after seeing Benson she changes her mind. Benson is angry at the double cross and picks up a stiletto and tries to attack her just as she turns out the light. Meanwhile, Luigi rehires Valerie and Walton.

Tilton goes to Nadia’s dressing in an effort to find Benson, but finds Nadia dead instead. He retrieves the letters, locks her door and calls the police. After the police arrive, the cook for the nightclub states that he saw a well dressed man leaving the back way.

After questioning everyone involved, Police Captain Flynn (John Cowell) wants Benson brought in for questioning. Tilton is certain Benson is not the guilty party and promises to discover who the murderer is using his newspaper column. Later, Benson turns up at Tilton’s apartment.

Valerie reads Tilton’s column the next day and arranges a meeting with Tilton, but is murdered before she has a chance to talk to him. Tilton visits Vi Van Ostrum and her father, Hugo Van Ostrum (William Bailey). Tilton shows him a receipt for a $15,000 diamond bracelet that he found in Nadia’s dressing room, indicating Van Ostrum has his own motive.

Now that Valerie is dead, Tilton talks Benson into turning himself in for his own safety, which he does. Tilton discovers that Nadia used to work for a nightclub in Chicago called Rossi, and that Luigi, then known as Rossi, used to own that nightclub. It also comes to light that Nadia has blackmailed before. Luigi is ruled out as the murderer however, as he has an airtight alibi. Meanwhile, Tilton promises to name the murderer the next day, which makes himself a target that flushes out the murderer.

Cast 
Ralph Forbes as Tommy Tilton
Marion Shilling as 'Smitty', newspaper photographer
Malcolm McGregor as Ted Benson
James Guilfoyle as Lou Baron, Private Investigator
John Cowell as Police Captain 'Pop' Flynn
William Bailey as William Hugo Van Ostrum, Vi's father
Agnes Anderson as Nadia Renee, aka Marina Farina
Claire Rochelle as Valerie Delroy, aka Maragert O'Brien
Gayne Kinsey as Walton, Valerie's Dance Partner
Harry Semels as Luigi, Club Owner
Al Klein as Club Waiter

References

External links 

 
 
 

1936 films
1936 crime drama films
American black-and-white films
American crime drama films
Films directed by Raymond K. Johnson
1930s English-language films
1930s American films